Chiara Cini (born 29 December 1990) is an Italian female fencer who was silver medal at senior level at the World Fencing Championships.

References

External links
 
 Chiara Cini at Fiamme Azzurre

1990 births
Living people
Italian female fencers
Italian foil fencers
Fencers of Fiamme Azzurre
Sportspeople from Pisa
World Fencing Championships medalists
Fencers at the 2015 European Games
European Games medalists in fencing
European Games bronze medalists for Italy
20th-century Italian women
21st-century Italian women